Mesophleps meliphanes is a moth of the family Gelechiidae. It is found in Southern Australia.

References

Moths described in 1894
Mesophleps